Dorrie Timmermanns-Van Hall (born 1 May 1965) is a retired Dutch wheelchair tennis player who competed in international level events. She has her lower limbs amputated due to complications from meningococcal sepsis. Her highest achievement was reaching the semifinals at the quads' doubles at the 2008 Summer Paralympics when she partnered with Bas van Erp.

References

External links
 
 

1955 births
Living people
Sportspeople from Arnhem
Paralympic wheelchair tennis players of the Netherlands
Wheelchair tennis players at the 2008 Summer Paralympics